Monckton is an English surname.

People
 Bridget Monckton, 11th Lady Ruthven of Freeland (1896–1982)
 Christopher J. Monckton (born 1954), musician, distant cousin of the Viscounts of Brenchley
 Christopher Monckton, 3rd Viscount Monckton of Brenchley (born 1952), UKIP politician
 Francis Monckton (1844–1926), politician, from the Viscounts of Galway family 
 John Monckton (1955–2004), murdered financier, cousin of the Viscounts of Brenchley 
 John Monckton (swimmer) (1938–2017), Australian swimmer
 John Monckton (town clerk) (1832–1902), Town Clerk of London, father of Lionel Monckton
 John Monckton, 1st Viscount Galway (1695 - 1751)
 George Monckton-Arundell, 6th Viscount Galway (1805–1876)
 George Monckton-Arundell, 7th Viscount Galway (1844–1931)
 George Monckton-Arundell, 8th Viscount Galway (1882–1943)
 Gilbert Monckton, 2nd Viscount Monckton of Brenchley (1915–2006)
 Henry Monckton (British Army officer) (1740–1778), killed in American Revolutionary War, brother of Robert 
 Lionel Monckton (1861–1924), composer for musical theatre 
 Robert Monckton (1726–1782), British general in North America and governor of New York (1726–1782)
 Rosa Monckton (born 1953), sister of the 3rd Viscount 
 Walter Monckton, 1st Viscount Monckton of Brenchley (1891–1965), lawyer and politician

Hereditary title
Viscount Monckton of Brenchley (created 1957)

Places 
 Moncton, in New Brunswick Province, Canada

See also
Moncton (disambiguation)
Monkton (disambiguation), place name in Britain and America
Monckton Synnot, Australian squatter